Phantasmagoria is the seventh studio album by the Norwegian symphonic black metal band Limbonic Art released in 2010 on Candlelight Records. All music was composed by Daemon alone since Morfeus had left the band leaving Daemon the only remaining Limbonic Art member.

Track listing

Personnel
Daemon - all instruments, vocals, producer, recording, mixing

Other staff
Vebjørn Strømmen - artwork, design
Henrik Bruun - producer, recording, mixing

External links
Phantasmagoria at Allmusic

2010 albums
Limbonic Art albums